is a passenger railway station in the city of Takasaki, Gunma, Japan, operated by the East Japan Railway Company (JR East).

Lines

Station layout
The station consists of two opposed side platforms connected to the station building by a footbridge. The station is attended.

Platforms

History
It was renamed Kita-Takasaki Station on 1 August 1919. With the privatization of the Japanese National Railways (JNR) on 1 April 1987, the station came under the control of JR East. A new station building was completed in March 2001.

Passenger statistics
In fiscal 2019, the station was used by an average of 1197 passengers daily (boarding passengers only).

Surrounding area
 Takasaki City University of Economics
 Niijima Gakuen Junior College

See also
 List of railway stations in Japan

References

External links

 JR East station information 

Shin'etsu Main Line
Railway stations in Gunma Prefecture
Railway stations in Japan opened in 1885
Stations of East Japan Railway Company
Takasaki, Gunma